Greg Myers may refer to:
Greg Myers (linguist)
Greg Myers (baseball) (born 1966), American former Major League Baseball player
Greg Myers (American football) (born 1972), American former National Football League player